Sylvain Bolay (born 31 October 1963) is a French former cyclist. He competed in the individual road race at the 1992 Summer Olympics.

References

External links
 

1963 births
Living people
French male cyclists
Olympic cyclists of France
Cyclists at the 1992 Summer Olympics
Sportspeople from Lausanne